Pasca is a town and municipality in the Cundinamarca department of Colombia located in the Andes. It belongs to the Sumapaz Province. It borders Fusagasugá, Sibaté and Soacha in the north, Bogotá D.C. in the north and east, Arbeláez in the south and Fusagasugá in the west. Is the entrance to the Páramo del Sumapaz, the biggest ecosystem in its genre in the world.

Etymology 
Pasca in the Chibcha language means "father's enclosure", according to Acosta Ortegón.

History 
Pasca in the time before the Spanish conquest was inhabited by the Muisca, organized in their Muisca Confederation. The southern Muisca territories were ruled from Muyquytá, the current capital. On April 6, 1536 conquistadors Gonzalo Jiménez de Quesada and his brother started the strenuous march into the inner highlands of Colombia. With 209 men he arrived on March 12, 1537, in Guachetá. From there he led his army to conquer the villages of the Muisca on the Bogotá savanna.

One of his captains, Juan de Céspedes, reached Pasca in July 1537, founding modern Pasca on July 15. It was the last village of the Muisca to be conquered before heading south into the domain of the Sutagao.

Economy 
Main economical activities in Pasca are livestock farming and agriculture, predominantly papa criolla, other potatoes, peas, onions, bunching onions, tree tomatoes, beans, carrots, cabbage, lettuce, tomatoes, corn, blackberries, coriander and the Colombian fruits gulupa and curuba.

Archeology 
The famous Muisca raft, representing the ritual of El Dorado, was found in Pasca in 1969. The raft is now part of the Gold Museum collection in Bogotá.

The town contains an archaeological museum and a natural history museum.

Famous pasqueños 
 Colombian poet and politician Adolfo León Gómez was born in Pasca and his grandmother, poet Josefa Acevedo de Gomez, lived and wrote her work here
 Native Zoratama lived in Pasca
Ivan Ramiro Sosa cyclist winner of multiple races.

Gallery

See also 

El Dorado
Juan de Céspedes
Archeological Museum of Pasca, Sumapaz National Park

References

External links 
  Photos of pre-Columbian art found in Pasca

Municipalities of Cundinamarca Department
Tourist attractions in Cundinamarca Department
1537 establishments in the Spanish Empire
Populated places established in 1537
1537 disestablishments in the Muisca Confederation